Jennifer Odessa Nettles (born September 12, 1974) is an American singer, songwriter, actress and record producer. 

Nettles is the lead vocalist of the duo Sugarland alongside Kristian Bush, and prior to this she fronted the Atlanta-based bands Soul Miner's Daughter and Jennifer Nettles Band. She also charted as a duet partner on the country version of rock band Bon Jovi's 2006 single "Who Says You Can't Go Home", a number-one hit on the Billboard country chart. Throughout her career, she has acquired numerous accolades, including three Grammy Awards, four Country Music Association Awards, and an American Music Award for her work both as a soloist and as one half of the duo Sugarland. 

Nettles is currently a judge on Go-Big Show (2021).

Personal life
Nettles was born and raised in the small town of Douglas, Georgia, United States, graduating from Coffee High School and Agnes Scott College in Decatur, Georgia. Nettles married Todd Van Sickle in 1998, but the couple divorced in 2007. On November 26, 2011, Nettles married her boyfriend of two years, Justin Miller, in a sunset ceremony at Blackberry Farm in East Tennessee. On June 18, 2012, Nettles and her husband announced they were expecting their first child in November 2012. Their son was born in December 2012.

Musical beginnings
Nettles began performing at school assemblies, her Southern Baptist church, and in community theater. She was also a member of Georgia 4-H's Clovers & Company performing arts group from 1986 to 1993.

Nettles studied Spanish and Anthropology at Agnes Scott College in Decatur, Georgia, and graduated in 1997. While a student there, Nettles and Cory Jones (who at the time was studying classical guitar at the University of Georgia) formed the group Soul Miner's Daughter.  Performing as both an acoustic duo and with a band, they released two albums: The Sacred and Profane in 1996 and Hallelujah in 1998, both of which were composed of songs written collaboratively by Jones and Nettles. Soul Miner's Daughter was invited to perform at the Atlanta installment of Lilith Fair in 1999.

In 1999, she formed the Jennifer Nettles Band, with which she released three studio albums and two live albums.  The band, which in addition to Nettles included Brad Sikes (drums), Scott Nicholson (piano), Wesley Lupold (bass), and Mike Cebulski (percussion), was selected the grand prize winner from more than 2000 bands in "The Big Deal $100,000 Music Search" presented by Mars Music.

Sugarland

In 2003, Nettles teamed up with Kristen Hall and Kristian Bush to form Sugarland. In 2006, Kristen Hall left the group and Nettles and Bush continued on as a duo releasing Enjoy the Ride in November 2006. Their third album, titled Love on the Inside, was released on July 22, 2008. Regarding the trio's collaboration, she said:

We really wanted to get out of where we had all been as artists and move beyond that to something bigger. Consequently all the songs reflect that; 'Fly Away,' 'Baby Girl,' all of those songs - you speak to the human condition and write what you know in your life.

Sugarland was nominated for a Grammy award in the Best New Artist category in 2006. Although they did not win the award, Nettles and Bush performed for the awards show and Nettles presented both a Lifetime Achievement Award to Merle Haggard and the award for Best Country Group.

A duet performance with rock band Bon Jovi, "Who Says You Can't Go Home", reached No. 7 on the Bubbling Under Hot 100 chart and No. 1 on the Billboard Hot Country Singles chart. The video for the song won a CMT Music Award in 2006 for Collaborative Video Of The Year. In February 2007, Nettles and Bon Jovi won a Grammy for Best Country Vocal Collaboration.

In an interview on Fox News with Martha MacCullum, Nettles expressed interest in appearing in a Broadway play, stating in particular that she would like to play the role of Elphaba in Wicked.

In early December 2008, Sugarland received three Grammy Award nominations and performed on the 51st Annual Grammy Awards show on February 8, 2009. They won awards for Best Country Song and Best Country Performance by a Duo or Group.

On January 18, 2009, Nettles performed at the We Are One: The Obama Inaugural Celebration at the Lincoln Memorial, singing James Taylor's "Shower the People" with James Taylor and John Legend.

On February 11, 2009, Sugarland received two nominations from the Academy of Country Music for Top Vocal Duo and Vocal Event of the Year for "Life in a Northern Town". During the broadcast of the April 5, 2009 awards show, Sugarland was presented with the Vocal Duo of the Year award, ending Brooks & Dunn's nine-year run. Nettles also received a Milestone award, presented to her by Reba McEntire.

ABC broadcast the first CMA Country Christmas, hosted by Nettles, on November 29, 2010. Nettles and Sugarland partner Kristian Bush kicked off the evening with their rendition of "Winter Wonderland", backed by Little Big Town. The pair returned to the stage later in the program to perform the hymn "Come, O Come Emmanuel", just before the "Jingle Bell Rock" group grande finale of the 90-minute special. Until 2016, Nettles was the sole host of Country Christmas but was replaced by Reba McEntire for the 2017 show.

After a five-year hiatus while Nettles and Bush recorded solo projects, Sugarland officially reunited in 2017 at the 51st Annual Country Music Association Awards and announced that they were working on new music together. The lead single off their sixth studio album Bigger, “Still the Same" was released on December 21, 2017.

Duets and solo career
In 2009, Jennifer Nettles performed at the Kennedy Center Honors for Bruce Springsteen and a second time in 2011 for Neil Diamond.

In 2012, Nettles appeared as a judge on the ABC singing competition series Duets alongside Kelly Clarkson, John Legend and Robin Thicke. The show was cancelled after one season.

Nettles announced in May 2013 that she would begin working on a solo album. Her first solo single, "That Girl", was released in August. Nettles co-wrote the song with Butch Walker, and Rick Rubin produced it. The album, also titled That Girl, was released on January 14, 2014.

On June 4, 2014, Nettles performed "All of Me" with John Legend and Hunter Hayes at the CMT Music Awards.

In July 2015, Nettles parted ways with Mercury Nashville. Nettles then signed with Big Machine Label Group. Nettles announced that she would be going on the "Playing With Fire Tour" with Ryan Kindler and Brandy Clark as her opening acts. The tour was then extended by CMT and promoted as "CMT Presents Jennifer Nettles with 2016 Next Women of Country Tour" with Brandy Clark and special guest Lindsay Ell and Tara Thompson for over 30 dates across the country starting in January 2016. Nettles then released a music video for her song "Sugar", she would be performing this song, which is off her upcoming album, at the 89th Macy's Thanksgiving Day Parade on the Domino Sugar float.  Nettles then released the first official single, off her upcoming album with Big Machine, "Unlove You" which she debuted on The Tonight Show Starring Jimmy Fallon on November 24. In March 2017, Nettles made her international solo debut at the C2C: Country to Country festival. For six years in a row she has hosted the CMA Country Christmas on ABC. In 2018 Jennifer Nettles duetted with Josh Groban on his "Bridges" and "Bridges Live" albums with the Groban-penned song "99 Years". In December 2019 Nettles ended her solo deal with Big Machine Records but her duo Sugarland signed an exclusive deal with Big Machine.

To coincide with the sixteenth anniversary of the 9/11 attack, Nettles released a song called "King of the City", which tells the story of an immigrant who lost his life during the tragedy. Of the track, Nettles said "it has been so long since I started writing this song, but I was only able to finish it in the last year. I was inspired by the political tensions in our country right now. I want to humanize the immigrant story as an American story, and allow people a different narrative from what they might, or might not, be seeing on the news or in their communities".

Acting
Nettles made her acting debut in the NBC television movie, Dolly Parton's Coat of Many Colors portraying Dolly Parton's mother. It premiered on December 10, 2015. She reprised her role in the sequel Dolly Parton's Christmas of Many Colors: Circle of Love which premiered on November 30, 2016.

In February 2015, Nettles joined the Broadway cast of Chicago, where she played the role of Roxie Hart for a limited engagement. In April 2016, she had a role on the WGN America hit series Underground. Her role was as a wife and mother who became a mental patient.

In 2019, Nettles portrayed Aimee-Leigh Gemstone, the deceased matriarch of a fictional Southern evangelical family in HBO’s dark comedy The Righteous Gemstones. She also co-starred in the drama Harriet, about abolitionist Harriet Tubman, playing Eliza Brodess. The film was directed by Kasi Lemmons.

She played the lead role of Jenna in the musical Waitress on Broadway from October 19 to November 25, 2021.

Activism
Nettles has lent her time and talent to support various non-profit organizations.  Nettles has been a longtime supporter of the Shalom foundation. She raised more than $120,000 for the foundation in 2007.

In 2008, she launched Common Thread, a series of musical events enabling artists to come together to share music and raise money for their favorite charities. The first three Common Thread concerts included performances by Nettles, Sugarland partner Kristian Bush, Emily Saliers, and Amos Lee and raised funds for the American Cancer Society, American Liver Foundation, Honor the Earth, and Intercultural Family Services.

Following the January 2010 earthquake in Haiti, Nettles and Sugarland partner Bush sang on the remake of We Are the World as part of Artists for Haiti.

In February 2012, Nettles was one of a group of celebrities who walked down a catwalk in red dresses for the 'Heart Truth Red Dress Collection' show, part of New York Fashion Week. She wore a David Meister dress.

In November 2019, Nettles attended the CMA Awards wearing a Christian Siriano design with a hot-pink train. The train had a hand-painted graffiti painting by Alice Mizrahi and a message stating "play our [expletive] records; Please and Thank You", and the backside said "equal play". Nettles' outfit was in protest of country music radio stations not giving equal play time to female artists.

At the 2020 CMT Music Awards, she was recognized for her activism in the fight for equal play with the first CMT Equal Play award.

Discography

Studio demos

Studio albums

Extended plays

Live albums

Solo singles

Guest singles

Other charted songs

Music videos

Awards
 1999 Lilith Fair Acoustic Talent Search winner, Soul Miner's Daughter
 2001 1st Annual Independent Music Awards Regional Poll in Atlanta for "Bad Girl's Lament" 
 2005 American Music Awards, Sugarland wins Favorite Breakthrough Artist
 2006 Academy of Country Music, Sugarland wins Top New Duo or Vocal Group
 2006 CMT Collaborative Video of the Year, "Who Says You Can't Go Home"
 2007 Grammy Award Best Country Collaboration with Vocals, "Who Says You Can't Go Home"
 2007 Country Music Association Awards, Sugarland wins Vocal Duo Of the Year
 2008 Country Music Association Awards, Sugarland wins Vocal Duo Of the Year
 2008 Academy of Country Music, Song of the Year, "Stay" (songwriter)
 2008 Country Music Association Awards Song of the Year, "Stay" (songwriter)
 2009 Grammy Award Best Country Performance By A Duo Or Group for "Stay" 
 2009 Grammy Award Best Country Song for "Stay" (songwriter)
 2009 Academy of Country Music, Milestone award; Sugarland wins Vocal Duo of the Year
 2009 Country Music Association Awards, Sugarland wins Vocal Duo Of the Year
 2010 Country Music Association Awards, Sugarland wins Vocal Duo Of the Year
 2011 Academy of Country Music, Sugarland wins Vocal Duo of the Year
 2011 Country Music Association Awards, Sugarland wins Vocal Duo Of the Year
 2020 CMT Equal Play Award from the CMT Music Awards

Filmography

Film

Television

References

External links

Jennifer Nettles CMT.com Biography

1974 births
Agnes Scott College alumni
American acoustic guitarists
21st-century American actresses
American contraltos
American country guitarists
American women country singers
American country singer-songwriters
Big Machine Records artists
Country musicians from Georgia (U.S. state)
Grammy Award winners
Independent Music Awards winners
Living people
Mercury Records artists
People from Douglas, Georgia
Sugarland members
Guitarists from Georgia (U.S. state)
21st-century American women singers
21st-century American women guitarists
21st-century American guitarists
21st-century American singers
Concord Records artists
Singer-songwriters from Georgia (U.S. state)
Activists from Georgia (U.S. state)